Stewart Thompson (born 2 September 1964) is an English former footballer who played as a forward.

A former England schoolboy international, Thompson now works with the Manchester City academy.

References

1964 births
Living people
English footballers
Association football forwards
Rochdale A.F.C. players
English Football League players